Multi-stop trucks (also known as walk-in delivery or step vans) are a type of light-duty and medium-duty truck created for local deliveries to residences and businesses. They are designed to be driven either sitting down or standing up, and often provide easy access between the driver and goods, hence the name “walk-in delivery” van. They are taller than full-size vans, such as the Ford Econoline, Dodge A-Series/B-Series/Ram Vans, and Chevrolet G-Series vans, but can have wheelbases that are shorter than these models or longer.



Uses
Though commonly referred to as "bread trucks" and "bakery trucks," trucks like these are used for delivering many other goods and services. Many have also referred to them as “step-vans” despite the fact that this was a name only used by Chevrolet (see below).

Another common group of users include electric power companies, both with and without cherry picker scoops. The ones with such devices tend to be half-cab vans. Occasionally they have been mounted with common truck bodies, such as bottlers. In the 1980s Frito-Lay bought fleets of Olsons that were redesigned to tow light commercial 5th-wheel Olson trailers. School and library systems frequently have used them for bookmobiles, when bus bodies are not preferred. 

Partially due to their size, they have also been used as large ambulances. Subsequently, fire departments have also used them for this purpose, as well as for utility vehicles, radio command centers, canteens, and other secondary work. Police S.W.A.T. teams and other special units have used them as combined deployment and mobile command centers. An all-aluminum 1974 CM-Series International Harvester Metro Van P-40 painted black and lettered in white fitted with red takedown lamps and a siren speaker on its white roof was featured speeding to and famously skidding to halt at a crime scene for the 1975-76 police action title sequence of the TV series S.W.A.T. and was typically featured four or five times each episode to the show's theme song as the team was dispatched; running aboard, traveling in while utilizing the radio-telephone and jumping out of the Mobile Tactical Unit.

Postal workers also use them in larger deliveries. Parcel companies such as UPS and FedEx have used them for decades. Since 1966, Grumman Olson, and Southern, have made UPS trucks designed exclusively for that company. Another popular use is as food trucks. Ice cream distributors such as Mister Softee and others have found these types of trucks to be far more suitable than cowl-and-chassis-based pickup trucks. Many have been converted into "Jitney" buses. Some are converted into motor homes either by manufacturers or private citizens who buy used models.

Manufacturers
Chevrolet Step-Van and its twin GMC Value Van or others were successors to the shared "Dubl-Duti" delivery vans, produced by General Motors. They had classifications as light as 1/2 ton trucks, and as heavy as 2 ton trucks. Additionally they produced the successful P-series of step van chassis and the value van. GM gasoline and diesel engines powered vehicles which, like competitors’ chassis, got bodies from outside suppliers. Large delivery fleets like FedEx, UPS and Frito-Lay were among its customers. Some later models were available with the Step Van/Value Van cab and Olson after-body. Motor Homes were built around Step-Vans & Value Vans; the GMC Motor Home (which was built between 1973 and 1978) was not related. The series was discontinued in the late 1990s and then became the Workhorse company (see separate entry below).
Divco was making vehicles such as these from its inception. By the late 1930s they gained short curved hoods and separated fenders resembling the Chrysler Airflow doghouse. This design made them well known and remained virtually unchanged until 1986. By 1957, when the company bought Wayne Works they began manufacturing larger versions of these vans which did not contain typical 1930s design cues. A later version called the Dividend had a front resembling other walk-in vans which cut several inches off the length of the front portion of the truck. Some Dividends were fitted out as mini-buses with Wayne bus parts.
The Dodge Route-Van was made between 1948 and 1951. It was succeeded by the Dodge Job-Rated, and was itself replaced with the Dodge P-Series, which like the Ford P-Series were stripped-chassis that could be fitted with  made-to-order bodies. Chrysler manufactured these models until 1979.
Ford Vanette, Ford MTO-71 or Ford FFV was made between 1948 and 1970. It succeeded the Walk-In versions of the Ford F-Series trucks, and had the same grilles of the Ford F-Series from 1951-1955. After 1956, it retained the 1955 grilles until the model was discontinued and replaced with the Ford P-Series chassis. These models were stripped-chassis that could be fitted with made-to-order bodies, and often contained red crests on the grilles reading "Chassis By FORD."
International Metro Van was originally based on the 1937-40 D-Series trucks. Its name came about as its body was originally developed and built by the Metropolitan Body Company in Bridgeport, Connecticut; this company later became a wholly owned subsidiary of International Harvester. In the 1950s, they began producing variations such as the "Metro-Lite," "Metro-Mite," and "Metro-Multi-Stop" vans. There was also the bonneted "Metroette," which used versions of the front sheetmetal of International's contemporary pickup models. the design of this van remained nearly unchanged from its inception in 1938 until its full redesign in 1964. By 1972, all IHC Metro Vans were stripped-chassis that other manufacturers could build on, and after 1975, they were discontinued along with all other light-duty trucks except for the Scout, which was last made in 1980.
Morgan Olson 'Route Star' MT45 and MT55 are built on a Freightliner chassis and could handle large delivery/commercial applications. It had a variety of features designed to fit the needs of businesses along with quick and easy access to cargo.
Morris Commercial in the UK, made the J-type van from 1949 until 1961, and the Austin 101 variant from 1957.
Pak-Age-Car Corporation and successors Stutz Motor Company and Auburn Automobile sold the Pak-Age-Car from 1926 until 1941.
Precision, a small Arkansas based company made step vans and later by Phoenix Commercial Vehicles in Arizona.
Studebaker had walk-in delivery vans. In 1963 they added ZIP vans, which existed until the company collapsed in 1966.
Utilimaster has been building multi-stop delivery vehicles and other vans since 1973; currently they manufacture the Isuzu Reach in a collaboration with the Japanese manufacturer. In the 1980s and 1990s the company manufactured the aerodynamic, front-wheel drive Aeromate on their own chassis, using Chrysler's turbocharged four-cylinder or 3.3-litre V6 engines.
White Motor Company originally built the White Horse from 1939 to 1942. Later, they built the White PDQ Delivery van between 1960 and 1966.
Willys produced the Walk-In Willys Van from 1941 to 1942, which were based on the 441 trucks. After World War Two, most of Willys' truck manufacturing was concentrated on Jeeps, although Jeep did offer walk-in delivery type bodies for some of its pickups. Under ownership by Kaiser, Jeep built the FJ-3, FJ-3A, and FJ-6 delivery vans, and in 1975 AM General built the Jeep FJ-9. Jeep also supplied chassis for bodies made by Highway Products and other manufacturers.
Workhorse Custom Chassis, a Navistar International company, was started in 1998 by investors who took over production and sales of General Motors’ popular P-series Stepvan chassis when GM dropped it. Navistar acquired Workhorse in 2005; AMP Electric Vehicles purchased acquired the Workhorse brand and the Workhorse Custom Chassis assembly plant in Union City, Indiana in March 2015, and adopted the name Workhorse Group Incorporated. For a short time Workhorse offered an integrated chassis-body product called MetroStar. As of 2016, Workhorse was offering the E-Gen step van with plug-in hybrid (or "extended range electric") drivetrain.

As of today, most manufacturers of these types of vehicles build them on existing chassis made by General Motors, Ford and Freightliner Trucks. These include such companies as Alf-Herman, Boyertown, Flxible, DurAvan, DeKalb, General, Gerstenslager, Lyn, Mark, Montpelier, Murphy, Orville, Southern Coach, Swift, Utilimaster Universal and Van-All has built this type, referring to them as "Step Vans".

See also
 Cutaway van chassis

References

Trucks
Commercial vehicles